The following is a list of people executed by the U.S. state of Wyoming.

A total of 7 men were executed prior to Wyoming becoming a State on July 10, 1890:

18 men were executed by the state of Wyoming between its statehood and the Supreme Court ban on executions in 1972:

Wyoming enacted its post-Furman death penalty statute on February 28, 1977. One man has been executed in the state of Wyoming since then:

One federal execution has taken place in Wyoming:

See also 
 Capital punishment in Wyoming
 Capital punishment in the United States

References

 
Wyoming
People executed